Members of the Lok Sabha (House of the People) or the lower house of Parliament of India are elected by being voted upon by all adult citizens of India, from a set of candidates who stand in their respective constituencies. Every adult citizen of India can vote only in their constituency. Candidates who win the Lok Sabha elections are called 'Member of Parliament' and hold their seats for five years or until the body is dissolved by the President on the advice of the Union Council of Ministers headed by the Prime Minister. The house meets in the Lok Sabha Chamber of the Sansad Bhavan in New Delhi, on matters relating to creation of new laws, removing or improving the existing laws that affect all citizens of India. Elections take place once in five years to elect 543 members for the Lok Sabha.

The first elections to the Lok Sabha took place during 1951–52.

List of Lok Sabha general elections in India

See also
 Elections in India
 List of Indian presidential elections
 List of Indian vice presidential elections
 List of Rajya Sabha elections
 List of Indian state legislative assembly elections
 Government of India
 Parliament of India
 Lok Sabha
 Member of Parliament, Lok Sabha

References

India
Elections in India
General elections in India
India politics-related lists